Pegasus was an early British vacuum-tube (valve) computer built by Ferranti, Ltd that pioneered design features to make life easier for both engineers and programmers. Originally it was named the Ferranti Package Computer as its hardware design followed that of the Elliott 401 with modular plug-in packages. Much of the development was the product of three men: W. S. (Bill) Elliott (hardware); Christopher Strachey (software) and Bernard Swann (marketing and customer support). It was Ferranti's most popular valve computer with 38 being sold. The first Pegasus was delivered in 1956 and the last was delivered in 1959. Ferranti received funding for the development from the National Research Development Corporation (NRDC).

At least two Pegasus machines survive, one in The Science Museum, London and one which was displayed in the Science and Industry Museum, Manchester but which has now been removed to the storage in the Science Museum archives at Wroughton. The Pegasus in The Science Museum, London ran its first program in December 1959 and was regularly demonstrated until 2009 when it developed a severe electrical fault. In early 2014, the Science Museum decided to retire it permanently, effectively ending the life of one of the world's oldest working computers. The Pegasus officially held the title of the world's oldest computer until 2012, when the restoration of the Harwell computer was completed at the National Museum of Computing.

Design
In those days it was common for it to be unclear whether a failure was due to the hardware or the program. As a consequence, Christopher Strachey of NRDC, who was himself a brilliant programmer, recommended the following design objectives:
 The necessity for optimum programming (favoured by Alan Turing) was to be minimised, "because it tended to become a time-wasting intellectual hobby of the programmers".
 The needs of the programmer were to be a governing factor in selecting the instruction set.
 It was to be cheap and reliable.

The first objective was only partially met: because both program and the data on which it was to operate had to be in the 128 words of primary storage contained in 8-word nickel delay lines. The rest of the memory was held on a 7936-word magnetic drum, which rotated at 3750 rpm, so it was often necessary to use ingenuity to reduce the number of transfers between the fast store and the drum.

Pegasus had eight accumulators, seven of which could also be used as index registers, the first computer to allow this dual use. Accumulators 6 and 7 were known as p and q and were involved in multiply and divide and some double-length shift instructions. Each word contained 39 bits plus 1 bit for parity checking. Two 19-bit instructions were packed into one word, with the extra bit that could be used to indicate a breakpoint (optional stop), to assist in debugging. In line with Strachey's second objective, it had a relatively generous instruction set for a computer of its time, but there was no explicit hardware provision for handling either characters or floating-point numbers.

The speed of arithmetic operations was about the same as in the Elliott 402 computer, which could add in 204 microseconds and multiply in 3366 microseconds. The Pegasus basic instruction cycle time for add/subtract/move and logical instructions was 128 microseconds. Multiply, divide, justify and shift instructions took a variable time to complete. Transfers to and from the drum were synchronous. The layout of blocks on the drum was interleaved to allow some processing between transfers to/from consecutive blocks. The computer was advertised as weighing .

To what extent Strachey's third objective was reached, depends on how one views a price of £50,000 for Pegasus 1, which did not have magnetic tape drives, line printer or punched card input and output. The modular design with plug-in units of hardware did, however, make it very reliable by the standards of the day, and maintenance was "a doddle of a job".

Applications

The initial version of Pegasus, Pegasus 1 was intended for scientific and engineering applications. Its input was via 5-hole paper tape with output on tape. The variant for business data processing was called Pegasus 2 and could be equipped with punched cards, magnetic tape and line printer.

In 1956 the first Pegasus was used to calculate the stresses and strains in the tail plane of the Saunders-Roe SR.53; the results were used to check the manufacturers figures; the programmer was Anne Robson. Because of the importance of a computer, it was housed in the drawing room, complete with an Adam's ceiling, of Ferranti's London office in Portland Place.

A Pegasus 1 was installed at Cyber House, Sheffield by Stafford Beer for the use of United Steel. It was the first computer installed for management cybernetics.
The Pegasus at Southampton University was used for analysis of ground resonance data for the Saro P.531 helicopter, which eventually entered production as the Westland Scout and Westland Wasp.

In 1959 Handley Page Ltd were advertising for experienced Pegasus programmers to join their aviation design team at Cricklewood, London 

The University of Leeds had a Pegasus computer, run by Sandy Douglas. This was used, among other things, for a project to process the University's matriculation records.

Other people who worked on the Pegasus included Hugh McGregor Ross and Donald B. Gillies.

See also
 List of vacuum-tube computers

References

Bibliography

External links

 The History of Computing Project: The Industrial Era, 1955–1957 
 The 1962 edition of the Pegasus Programming Manual (38 MB PDF)
 The Computer Conservation Society, who helped to maintain the Pegasus installation in the London Science Museum

Early British computers
Pegasus
Vacuum tube computers
40-bit computers
Collections of the Science Museum, London